Béla Tarr (born 21 July 1955) is a Hungarian filmmaker. Debuting with the film Family Nest (1977), Tarr began his directorial career with a brief period of what he refers to as "social cinema", aimed at telling everyday stories about ordinary people, often in the style of cinema vérité. Over the next decade, he changed the cinematic style and thematic elements of his films. Tarr has been interpreted as having a pessimistic view of humanity; the characters in his works are often cynical, and have tumultuous relationships with one another in ways critics have found to be darkly comic. Almanac of Fall (1984) follows the inhabitants of a run-down apartment as they struggle to live together while sharing their hostilities. The drama Damnation (1988) was lauded for its languid and controlled camera movement, which Tarr would become known for internationally. Sátántangó (1994) and Werckmeister Harmonies (2000) continued his bleak and desolate representations of reality, while incorporating apocalyptic overtones. The former sometimes appears in scholarly polls of the greatest films ever made, and the latter received wide acclaim from critics. Tarr would later compete at the 2007 Cannes Film Festival with his film The Man from London, which opened to moderately positive reviews.

Tarr frequently collaborated with novelist László Krasznahorkai, film composer Mihály Víg, cinematographer Fred Kelemen, actress Erika Bók, and Ágnes Hranitzky (then his partner). She is sometimes credited as a co-director of his last three works. 

After the release of his film The Turin Horse (2011), which made many year-end "best-of" critics' lists, Tarr announced his retirement from feature-length film direction. In February 2013 he started a film school in Sarajevo, known as "film.factory", and moved in 2016. He has since created an installation that features newly shot film sequences, presented in a 2017 Amsterdam exhibition called Till the End of the World.

Life
Tarr was born in Pécs, but grew up in Budapest. His parents were in both the theatre and film industry: his father designed scenery, while his mother worked as a prompter at a theatre for more than 50 years. At the age of 10, Tarr was taken to a casting session run by Hungarian National Television (MTV) by his mother, and he ultimately won the role of the protagonist's son in a TV drama adaptation of Tolstoy's The Death of Ivan Ilyich. Other than a small role in Miklós Jancsó's film Szörnyek évadja (Season of Monsters, 1986) and few one-glimpse cameos (such as in Gábor Bódy's Dog's Night Song [1983]), Tarr has sought no other acting roles. By his own account, initially he sought to become a philosopher, and considered film-making as something of a hobby. However, after making his 8mm short films, the Hungarian government would not allow Tarr to attend university so he instead chose to pursue film production.

Early work

Tarr began to realize his interest in film making at the age of 16 by making amateur films and later working as a caretaker at a national House for Culture and Recreation. Most of his amateur works were documentaries, mostly about the life of workers or poor people in urban Hungary. His amateur work brought him to the attention of the Béla Balázs Studios (named in honor of the Hungarian cinema theorist who helped fund Tarr's 1977 feature debut, Családi tűzfészek, which Tarr began filming at age 22.) He shot the film with little budget and using non-professional actors in six days. The film was faithful to the "Budapest school" or "documentarist" style popular at the time within Béla Balázs Studios, maintaining absolute social realism on screen. Critics found the film to suggest the influence of the American director John Cassavetes, although Tarr denied having seen any of Cassavetes's films prior to shooting Családi tűzfészek, which was released in 1979.

After completing "Családi tűzfészek," Tarr began his studies in the Hungarian School of Theatrical and Cinematic Arts. The 1980 film Szabadgyalog (The Outsider) and the following year's Panelkapcsolat (The Prefab People) continued in much the same vein, with small changes in style. The latter was the first film by Tarr to feature professional actors in the leading roles. With a 1982 television adaptation of Macbeth, his work began to change dramatically. The film is composed of only two shots: the first shot (before the main title) is five minutes long, the second 67 minutes long.

Later work

After 1984's Őszi almanach (Almanac of Fall), Tarr (who had written his first four features alone) began collaborating with Hungarian novelist László Krasznahorkai for 1988's Kárhozat (Damnation). A planned adaptation of Krasznahorkai's epic novel Sátántangó took over seven years to realize; the 415-minute film was finally released to international acclaim in 1994. After this epic he released the 35-minute Journey on the Plain in 1995, but fell into silence until 2000's Werckmeister Harmóniák (Werckmeister Harmonies). It was acclaimed by critics and the Festival circuit in general.

Many, if not most, of the shots in these later films are around six to eleven minutes long. It is possible that for some, a month was spent on a single shot. In many of these shots the camera swoops, glides, pans, and/or cranes. Often it circles the characters, and sometimes even spans multiple scenes. A shot may, as in the opening of Sátántangó, travel with a herd of cows around a village, or follow the nocturnal peregrinations of a drunkard who is forced to leave his house because he's run out of alcohol. Susan Sontag has championed Tarr as one of the saviors of the modern cinema, saying she would gladly watch Sátántangó once a year.

After Werckmeister Harmonies he began filming A Londoni férfi (The Man From London) an adaptation of a Georges Simenon novel. It was scheduled to be released at the 2005 Cannes Film Festival in May, but production was postponed because of the February suicide of producer Humbert Balsan. Additionally, there were disputes with other producers regarding a possible change in the film's financing. It premiered at the 2007 Cannes Film Festival and was released worldwide in 2008. Tarr then began working on a film called A torinói ló (The Turin Horse) which he has said will be his last.

For many years, none of his work was available on DVD (except in Japan), but Werckmeister Harmonies and Damnation have been made available on a two-disc DVD in Europe, courtesy of Artificial Eye (who have also issued The Man From London) and both films are now available in North America on separate DVDs from Facets Video. Tarr's early works; Family Nest, The Outsider, and The Prefab People are also available on DVD in the US, courtesy of Facets. Facets was supposed to release Sátántangó on DVD on 28 November 2006 but was delayed until 22 July 2008. Artificial Eye released the film on 14 November 2006. A comparison of the two DVD editions has been posted at DVD Beaver. In 2020, a 4K restoration of Sátántangó was released on Blu-ray by Curzon Artificial Eye and was made available for online streaming by the Criterion Channel.

In September 2012, he received the BIAFF special award for lifetime achievement.

In June 2017, he received the lifetime achievement at Sardinia Film Festival, XII edition.

In July 2021, he executive-produced the Icelandic-Swedish-Polish horror-drama film Lamb, directed by his former student at film.factory, Valdimar Jóhannsson. It is due to be released on October 8th, 2021 by A24.

In December 2022, he received the lifetime achievement award at International Film Festival of Kerala, IFFK, 27th edition.

Influence

Gus Van Sant often cites Tarr as a huge influence on his later work, beginning with Gerry when Van Sant began using very long uninterrupted takes.

Cine Foundation International
In January 2011, Tarr joined the Board of Directors of the recently formed cinema foundation and NGO for human rights Cine Foundation International. In a press release dated 24 January 2011 Tarr made the following statement regarding the imprisonment of filmmakers Jafar Panahi and Mohammad Rasoulof:
Cinematography is an integral part of universal human culture! An attack against cinematography is desecrating universal human culture! This cannot be justified by any notion, ideology or religious conviction! Our friend, brother and esteemed colleague Jafar Panahi is in prison today, based on conjured and fictional accusations! Jafar did not do anything else than what is the duty of all of us; to talk honestly, fairly about our own country and loved ones, to show everything that surrounds us with tender tolerance and harsh austerity! Jafar’s real crime is that he did just that; gracefully, elegantly and with a roguish smile in his eyes! Jafar made us love his heroes, the people of Iran; he achieved that they have become members of our families! WE CANNOT LOSE HIM! This is our common responsibility, as despite all appearances we belong together.

Personal views
Tarr is a critic of nationalism, and in a 2016 interview said, "Trump is the shame of the United States. Mr. Orbán is the shame of Hungary. Marine Le Pen is the shame of France. Et cetera." In a letter hung near the entrance to a pro-migration exhibition in front of the Hungarian Parliament, Tarr wrote, "We have brought the planet to the brink of catastrophe with our greediness and our unlimited ignorance. With the horrible wars we waged with the goal of robbing the people there. [...] Now we are confronted with the victims of our acts. We must ask the question: who are we, and what morality do we represent when we build a fence to keep out these people?"

On his religious views, Tarr is an atheist.

Filmography

Feature films
 Családi tűzfészek / Family Nest (1979)
 Szabadgyalog / The Outsider (1981)
 Panelkapcsolat / The Prefab People (1982)
 Őszi almanach / Almanac of Fall (1984)
 Kárhozat / Damnation (1988)
 Sátántangó / Satan's Tango (1994)
 Werckmeister harmóniák / Werckmeister Harmonies (2000)
 A londoni férfi / The Man from London (2007)
 A torinói ló / The Turin Horse (2011)

Television films
 Macbeth (1982)

Short films
 Hotel Magnezit (1978)
 Utazás az alföldön / Journey on the Plain (1995)
 Visions of Europe (film) (2004)
 segment: Prologue

Documentary films
 Az utolsó hajó / The Last Boat (1990, 31 min), segment from City Life
 Muhamed (2017, 10 min)
 Missing People (2019, 95 min)

Sources
 Ramón Andrés, «Nada. A propósito de El caballo de Turín de Béla Tarr», en Pensar y no caer Barcelona, Acantilado, 2016, pp. 195–220.
 Thorsten Botz-Bornstein, Organic Cinema: Film Architecture, and the Work of Bela Tarr (New York: Berghahn, 2017)
 Jacques Rancière, Béla Tarr, The Time After (Minneapolis: Univocal, 2013)
 András Bálint Kovács, The Cinema of Béla Tarr: The Circle Closes" (London: Wallflower, 2013) 
 Ira Jaffe: Slow Movies, Countering the Cinema of Action'' (New York: Wallflower Press, 2014)

References

External links
 
 
 Béla Tarr on the Board of Directors for Cine Foundation International
 Brightlightsfilm.com Interview
 Kinoeye Essay
 Declaration of Solidarity for Béla Tarr, by Fred Kelemen, FIPRESCI website, March 2005, retrieved 17 April 2006
 Vajramedia Presents: Sátántangó Berlinale 1994 Forum Documentation
 Tarr with His DFFB Film Students

1955 births
Hungarian atheists
Hungarian film directors
Hungarian screenwriters
Living people
People from Pécs
Hungarian experimental filmmakers
Hungarian filmmakers
Members of the Széchenyi Academy of Literature and Arts